"Peggy Sue Got Married" is a song written and performed by Buddy Holly. It was posthumously released in July 1959 as a 45-rpm single with "Crying, Waiting, Hoping". It refers to his 1957 hit song "Peggy Sue". It was one of the first sequels of the rock era.

Buddy Holly version
Buddy Holly recorded the vocal, accompanying himself on guitar, on December 8, 1958, in apartment 4H of "The Brevoort" on New York City's Fifth Avenue. Studio musicians recorded backup vocals and instrumentals on June 30, 1959, at Coral Records' Studio A in New York. An alternate version of the song, with new instrumentals but without backup singers, was recorded in 1964. 

The studio recording sessions and overdubs for "Peggy Sue Got Married" were similar to those for the posthumous track "Crying, Waiting, Hoping".  Buddy Holly's original, undubbed home recording was used as theme music in the film Peggy Sue Got Married.

The Crickets version
The Crickets recorded their own version after Buddy Holly's death in June 1959. David Box, a native of Lubbock, Texas, and a Buddy Holly soundalike, joined the group as lead vocalist for this version of "Peggy Sue Got Married" which was released in the United States as the B-side of Coral 62238 in 1960. The Crickets had decided to use the original arrangements they had used for "Peggy Sue" with the only change being David Box on lead vocal.

Other cover versions

Rikki Henderson released his recording of "Peggy Sue Got Married" in 1959 as an Embassy Records 45 single.
South African Roger Smith recorded the song in 1962 in a version released on the Twistin' Wild album.
Fleetwood Mac recorded a version of the song in 1968 featuring Peter Green for BBC Radio One.
The Beatles performed the song at the 1969 Get Back/Let It Be sessions in 1969 in a medley with "Maybe Baby" with John Lennon on lead vocals.
The Hollies recorded a version using Buddy Holly's vocals from the December 5, 1958 demo take joined by returning member Graham Nash as part of the Not Fade Away tribute. 
John Doe recorded a version of the song that was included on the 2011 compilation album Rave On Buddy Holly.
In July 2015, UK Rollercoaster Records released a high-tech remix by Chris Hopkins.

In addition, David Bowie's "Ashes to Ashes" - itself a sequel song - paraphrases Holly's song in its opening lines, "Do you remember a guy that's been in such an early song?"

References

Sources
Amburn, Ellis (1996). Buddy Holly: A Biography. St. Martin's Press. .
Bustard, Anne (2005). Buddy: The Story of Buddy Holly. Simon & Schuster. .
Dawson, Jim; Leigh, Spencer (1996). Memories of Buddy Holly. Big Nickel Publications. .
Gerron, Peggy Sue (2008). Whatever Happened to Peggy Sue?. Togi Entertainment. .
Goldrosen, John; Beecher, John (1996). Remembering Buddy: The Definitive Biography. New York: Da Capo Press. .
Goldrosen, John (1975). Buddy Holly: His Life and Music. Popular Press. 
Gribbin, John (2009). Not Fade Away: The Life and Music of Buddy Holly. London: Icon Books. 

1959 singles
Buddy Holly songs
Songs written by Buddy Holly
Songs released posthumously
Sequel songs
1958 songs
Coral Records singles